Drenge are an English three-piece rock band made up of Eoin Loveless, on guitar and vocals, his younger brother Rory, on drums, and Rob Graham on bass. The brothers grew up in Castleton, Derbyshire, where they formed the band in 2010, relocating to Sheffield in 2014. The band take their name from something "that would sound like a noise that we would be playing on stage". Their name also translates into "Boys" in Danish. They have released three albums, Drenge (2013), Undertow (2015), and Strange Creatures (2019).

Background

In January 2013, Drenge, who had a small following at the time, were picked up by national media when The Guardians Paul Lester featured them in his "New band of the week" column. The band rose to further prominence seven months later following the resignation of Labour MP Tom Watson from the Shadow Cabinet in July 2013. Watson wrote in his resignation letter on his blog: "be that great Labour leader that you can be, but try to have a real life too. And if you want to see an awesome band, I recommend Drenge."

Drenge have toured extensively in the UK, and have appeared at Glastonbury Festival, Latitude Festival, and Reading and Leeds Festival. They have also toured with Californian duo Deap Vally, including an appearance close to their hometown at Sheffield's Queens Social Club. They also toured with British band Peace in late 2013. They played a headline tour in the first half of 2014, as well as playing at many festivals over the summer of 2014, including Reading and Leeds, Glastonbury and T in the Park.

In recent activity Drenge have toured the UK alongside American punk rock band Radkey, appeared on Later... with Jools Holland, and their single "Bloodsports" was used for an advert for British TV show Misfits, fitting the crude, aggressive nature of the show.

Their self-titled album was released on 19 August 2013 on Infectious Records. The artwork for the album features a photograph of Wardsend Cemetery in Sheffield and a nearby scrapyard.

On 27 January 2015, they made their US network television début on the Late Show with David Letterman.

On 6 April 2015, the band's second album, Undertow, was released, debuting at number 14 on the UK Albums Chart.

For their tour in 2015 the band included a bassist in their live line-up as well as in their new single "We Can Do What We Want".

In February 2018, the band announced their first tour in over two years.

Band members

Members
 Eoin Loveless – lead vocals, guitar (2010–present)
 Rory Loveless – drums, percussion, backing vocals (2010–present)
 Rob Graham – bass, backing vocals (2015–present)

Discography

Studio albums
Drenge (August 2013, Infectious)
Undertow (April 2015, Infectious)
Strange Creatures (February 2019, Infectious)

References

Musical groups from Sheffield
Musical groups established in 2011
Rock music duos
Musical groups from Derbyshire
NME Awards winners
People from Castleton, Derbyshire
Infectious Music artists
Sibling musical groups
British musical trios
English musical duos
English blues rock musical groups
English garage rock groups
English grunge groups
2011 establishments in England